Maxdorf is a municipality in the Rhein-Pfalz-Kreis, in Rhineland-Palatinate, Germany. It is situated approximately 11 km west of Ludwigshafen.

Maxdorf is also the seat of the Verbandsgemeinde ("collective municipality") Maxdorf.

References

Rhein-Pfalz-Kreis